Tyrone Armory is an historic National Guard armory located at Tyrone, Blair County, Pennsylvania.  It was built between 1912 and 1918, and is an "I"-plan building built of Medina sandstone in the Late Gothic Revival style.  The two-story front section houses administrative functions, and the rear is the former stable area.  Between these sections is the drill hall, which has a hipped roof.

The armory was added to the National Register of Historic Places in 1989.

References

Armories on the National Register of Historic Places in Pennsylvania
Gothic Revival architecture in Pennsylvania
Infrastructure completed in 1918
Buildings and structures in Blair County, Pennsylvania
National Register of Historic Places in Blair County, Pennsylvania